José Daniel Falla Robles (7 October 1956 – 1 May 2021) was a Colombian Roman Catholic bishop.

Biography
Falla Robles was born in Colombia and ordained to the priesthood in 1992. He served as titular bishop of Calama and as auxiliary bishop of the Roman Catholic Archdiocese of Cali, Colombia, from 2009 to 2016 and as bishop of the Roman Catholic Diocese of Soacha, Colombia, from 2016 until his death from COVID-19 on 1 May 2021 in Soacha during the COVID-19 pandemic in Colombia.

Notes

1956 births
2021 deaths
21st-century Roman Catholic bishops in Colombia
People from Bogotá
Deaths from the COVID-19 pandemic in Colombia
Roman Catholic bishops of Soacha
Roman Catholic bishops of Cali